Sengerema is a town in Mwanza Region of Tanzania, East Africa. It is the administrative seat of Sengerema District, one of the districts of Mwanza Region. 

Sengerema District Hospital was founded in 1959 and it is located within Sengerema town.

Paved trunk road T4 from Mwanza to Geita runs through Sengerema town.

References

Populated places in Mwanza Region